Elymiotis is a genus of moths of the family Notodontidae erected by Francis Walker in 1857.

Species
Elymiotis notodontoides Walker, 1857
Elymiotis tlotzin (Schaus, 1892)

References

Notodontidae